"More Than a Name on a Wall" is a song written by Jimmy Fortune and John Rimel, and recorded by American country music group The Statler Brothers.  It was released in April 1989 as the third single from their Greatest Hits compilation album.  The song peaked at number 6 on the Billboard Hot Country Singles chart.

Content 
The song is about a mother visiting the Vietnam Wall to see her son's name.

Chart performance

Year-end charts

References

Songs about soldiers
Songs about the military
Songs about mothers
1989 singles
The Statler Brothers songs
Mercury Nashville singles
Songs written by Jimmy Fortune
Song recordings produced by Jerry Kennedy
1989 songs